Are Katika (also known as Are-Suryavanshi) are a community hailing from the South Indian states of Telangana, Andhra pradesh, Karnataka, Tamil Nadu including Maharashtra. Their traditional occupation includes working as hunters and soldiers.  They follow Hinduism and do not slaughter animals for Halal meat, which can only be done by Muslim Qureshis. They are known as Kshatriya who were assigned as soldiers of the Maratha clan. Also, Suryavanshi kings ruled over some parts of Maharashtra and Odisha.

References 

Hindu communities
Other Backward Classes of Maharashtra
Other Backward Classes of Karnataka
Social groups of Telangana